Promised Land is a rural locality in the local government area (LGA) of Kentish in the North-west and west LGA region of Tasmania. The 2016 census has a population of 44 for the state suburb of Promised Land.

History 
Promised Land was gazetted as a locality in 1957.

Geography

The waters of Lake Barrington form the western boundary.

Road infrastructure 
Route C140 (Staverton Road) passes through from north-east to south.

References

Localities of Kentish Council
Towns in Tasmania